The St. Sergius Chapel is a historic Russian Orthodox church in Chuathbaluk, Alaska, United States, in the Bethel Census Area. Now it is under Diocese of Alaska of the Orthodox Church in America.

Traditionally, the church is believed to have been built in 1891 by Father Ivan Orlov.  The wood-frame structure has three major elements.  At the western end is a gable-roof vestibule section with a small onion dome on top, and there is a similarly sized matching section at the eastern end.  The central section is a larger, roughly square structure, topped by a hip roof with a larger onion dome.
It was listed on the National Register of Historic Places in 1980.

See also
National Register of Historic Places listings in Bethel Census Area, Alaska

References 

Buildings and structures in Bethel Census Area, Alaska
Churches completed in 1891
Churches on the National Register of Historic Places in Alaska
Russian Orthodox church buildings in Alaska
Buildings and structures on the National Register of Historic Places in Bethel Census Area, Alaska